During the 2019–20 season, UD Las Palmas participated in the 2019–20 Segunda División and the Copa del Rey. The season covered the period from 1 July 2019 to 20 July 2020.

Current squad
.

Reserve team

Out on loan

Transfers
List of Spanish football transfers summer 2019#Las Palmas

In

Out

Pre-season and friendlies

Competitions

Overview

Segunda División

League table

Results summary

Results by round

Matches
The fixtures were revealed on 4 July 2019.

Copa del Rey

Statistics

Appearances and goals

Disciplinary

References

UD Las Palmas seasons
UD Las Palmas